Monteverde  is the twelfth canton of the Puntarenas province of Costa Rica. It is located in the Cordillera de Tilarán mountain range. Roughly a four-hour drive from the Central Valley, Monteverde is one of the country's major ecotourism destinations. The area is host to the Monteverde Cloud Forest Reserve and several other natural attractions, which draw considerable numbers of tourists and naturalists.

National Geographic has called the Monteverde Cloud Forest Biological Reserve "the jewel in the crown of cloud forest reserves". Newsweek has declared Monteverde the world's #14 "Place to Remember Before it Disappears". By popular vote in Costa Rica, Monteverde was deemed one of the Seven Natural Wonders of Costa Rica, along with Isla del Coco, Volcán Arenal, Cerro Chirripó, Río Celeste, Tortuguero, and Volcán Poás.

Santa Elena is the head town. Its homes and businesses serve as the region's tourist hub, along with the nearby neighborhood of Cerro Plano, the community of Monteverde proper, and numerous reserves and attractions in the greater region.

Toponymy
Monteverde translates directly to Green Mountain. Its official name is Monte Verde with a space separating the words.

Climate
Humidity oscillates between 74% and 97% (Nadkarni 2000: 34).

History

Various pre-Columbian artifacts testify to the existence of small populations of Clovis Native Americans, who once farmed in villages in the area circa 3000 BC. Between roughly 3300 BC to 2000 BC, the nearby tribes of the Arenal area experienced a population decline. These nearby tribes re-established villages in the region between 2000 BC to 500 BC. Agriculture intensified in the 500 BC to AD 300 period, with chiefdom societies replacing small tribal societies. Intense deforestation accompanied horticulture, and stone foundations dating to this period can be found. Jade objects became prominent characteristics of these villages. From AD 300 to 800, complex chiefdoms supplanted simpler chiefdoms and more intricate villages appear, with cemeteries, public squares,  gold-work and inter-tribal trade and conflict. Around 1300, a general decline in population occurred, possibly due to Arenal Volcano's increased activity.

After the Spanish made landfall in 1502, Costa Rica endured two generations of warfare. Nationwide indigenous populations fell from an estimated 400,000 to 80,000 within little more than 50 years. However, unlike Costa Rica's neighbors, Nicaragua and Panama, Costa Rica did not yield considerable amounts of indigenous labor or mineral resources, and thus the region experienced colonization at a much slower rate than many other Spanish colonies.

Early 20th century

In the first three decades of the 20th century, Creole populations arrived in small numbers to what is now called Monteverde. Many either worked for the Guacimal gold mines or provided its workers with goods and services. Some families also settled the nearby lower, warmer valley of San Luis.

1950s and forwards

What is now considered Monteverde was founded by Quakers from the United States whose pacifist values led them to defy the American draft before the Korean War. The majority of these settlers hailed from Fairhope, Alabama, and included some non-Quaker pacifists and conscientious objectors. The spokesman of the group was Hubert Mendenhall, a dairyman who had visited Costa Rica in 1949 as part of a farmer's tour. These Quakers and pacifists chose the area for its cool climate, which would facilitate dairy farming, due to the country's non-violent, army-free constitution, and its friendly Costa Rican inhabitants. The Quakers stewarded and farmed a large tract of land, part of which they eventually set aside for conservation, today the Reserva Biológica Bosque Nuboso Monteverde (Monteverde Cloud Forest Biological Reserve). This has become a major tourist attraction.

2005 bank raid
On March 8, 2005, a group of three armed Nicaraguan men raided and attempted to rob the Santa Elena branch of the state National Bank (Banco Nacional). A guard killed two of the armed men. However, one assailant held bank customers hostage for 28 hours. When authorities successfully attempted to retake the bank, a senior police officer and nine civilians died, and only one of the attackers survived. This event raised tensions between Nicaraguans and Costa Ricans nationwide and prompted higher security in many national banks.

Canton creation
As a district of Puntarenas canton, Monteverde had its own local government in the figure of a Municipal District Council, due to the long distance from the local government offices of the municipality of Puntarenas canton, therefore its inhabitants have pushed for becoming its own canton.

On 4 August 2021, the Legislative Assembly approved the file N.º 21618, which was then signed into law N.º 10019 by President Carlos Alvarado Quesada on 29 September 2021, which segregates the district from Puntarenas canton to become Monteverde canton. However, due to law N.º 6068  the change occurred until after 3 April 2022 as it was not possible to change the Territorial Administrative Division fourteen months before elections, which was the case due to the second round of the 2022 Costa Rican general election held on that date.

The canton will obtain its first municipality and mayor upon the local government elections of 2024.

Today

In recent years, the area's rapidly increasing numbers of tourists has brought a sizable influx of Costa Ricans from other towns and cities. Now, an estimated 250,000 tourists visit Monteverde a year. Improved goods and services, including partially paved roads, have arrived in recent years. In 2007, Costa Ricans voted Monteverde one of Costa Rica's Seven Wonders, along with Isla del Coco, Tortuguero, Arenal Volcano, Cerro Chirripó, Rio Celeste and Poás Volcano.

Geography 
The district of Monteverde has an area of  km2 and an average elevation of  metres.

Administrative territorial division
The canton of Monteverde is subdivided into only one district, occupying the same area as the whole canton:
 Monteverde, with postal code 61201

Santa Elena is the head town. The district also includes the neighborhoods and towns of Cerro Plano, Cuesta Blanca, La Lindora, Los Llanos, Monte Verde and San Luis.

Demographics

According to the 2011 census, Monteverde had a population of  inhabitants.

The official and most-spoken language is Spanish, as in the majority of Costa Rica. However, English-Spanish bilingualism is widespread due to the presence of Quakers and three bilingual schools.

Education
The area has several public grade and middle schools. These include the Escuela Santa Elena, the Escuela Cerro Plano, and two schools in San Luis. The Colegio San Rafael and Colegio Técnico Professional (also known as the Colegio Santa Elena) are responsible for the majority of secondary education in the area.

Private education is fairly robust in the Monteverde region. In 1951, the Quakers constructed a Quaker Meeting house, which served as classrooms and a general store. This became known as Monteverde Friends School (MFS) and today offers bilingual education to Pre-K through 12th grade to roughly 120 students.

A larger, non-Quaker bilingual (English/Spanish) institution, the Cloud Forest School, founded in 1991, now enrolls roughly 200 students from Pre-K through 11th grade, over 90% of whom are Costa Ricans. The CFS is accredited by the government of Costa Rica and over 50% of its graduates pursue higher education.

The small private Adventist school, the Escuela Adventista, is also bilingual.

While there is only one institution of higher education in Monteverde, the Distance State University (UNED), the region is home to a considerable number of local and foreign undergraduate and graduate programs. These include the Monteverde Institute, EAP, CIEE, and the University of Georgia (see below). Most residents of Monteverde pursue higher education in the Central Valley at institutions such as the University of Costa Rica.

Monteverde is also home to a substantial number of foreign-born scientists. A long-term resident of the town is the former lead guitarist of British new wave band Japan, Robert Dean, working as a professional ornithology writer.

Transportation

Road transportation 
The district is connected to and transversed by the following road routes:
 National Route 606
 National Route 619
 National Route 620

Economy

Agriculture

Agriculture has historically been the area's main source of income and sustenance for both Costa Ricans and Quakers. The original Creole populations relied mostly on subsistence agriculture and trade with the mining town of Guacimal. Initially locals hunted tapirs, deer, pacas, monkeys, and birds, but diminished those populations. They turned to pigs, corn, beans, vegetables, fruits, herbs and livestock. In the 1950s, both Quakers and Costa Ricans produced garlic, beef, flax, and homestead cheese. Quakers took advantages of the infrastructure improvements of the 1960s and exported cheese and beef to the rest of the country. However, due to overgrazing, the dairy industry declined in the 1970s. This led the population to turn to coffee. By the mid-1990s, coffee farmers were receiving some of the highest prices in the world for their coffee beans. In the mid-1990s 210 families were contributing milk to the local dairy factory, with a revenue of $5.2 million.

Tourism

Tourism is a growing sector in Monteverde's economy. In 1975, the region received fewer than one hundred visitors. This increased to around 50,000 in the mid-1990s. In recent years, the average has risen to 250,000 yearly tourists. Hotels, taxis, guides, and other tourist-geared services have operated since the early 1990s.

Places of interest

Nature

Due to the area's cloud forests and rain forests (including seven different ecological life zones), Monteverde has become a major part of the Costa Rican tourist trail - despite difficult access. Readers of the country's leading newspaper La Nación voted it one of the "7 Wonders of Costa Rica". Of Monteverde's quarter-million annual tourists, around 70,000 tourists visit the reserve.

The bulk of Monteverde's cloud forest can be found in the Monteverde Cloud Forest Reserve. The area around the park entrance is the most visited, and features six main trails, which total 13 km, are well-kept and easy to access. The reserve features a large network of less-accessible trails and a number of research stations, two of which house ten persons each, as well as one larger station that can house as many as forty-three persons, though these are now restricted to use by researchers only.

To the east of Monteverde lies the Children's Eternal Rainforest (El Bosque Eterno de los Niños) conservation area, a project funded by schools and children from all over the world. Farther north is the Reserva Santa Elena. This area attracts fewer tourists than the Monteverde Reserve, but offers a field station and views of Arenal Volcano.

Preserve

The massive  Monteverde Cloud Forest Reserve is the region's main draw, due largely to its excellent virgin and semi-virgin environment and world-class biodiversity. Scientists have determined this region to be home to the planet's largest number of orchids, at 500, with 34 being recent discoveries.  Fifty-eight species of amphibians, including the extinct Monteverde-endemic golden toad, have been found here. This area is also a stop for ninety-one species of migratory birds. The famed quetzal resides here seasonally. Monteverde's one-hundred-and-thirty-four mammal species include representatives from both North and South America, including six species of marsupials, three muskrats, at least fifty-eight bats, three primates, seven edentates, two rabbits, one ground hog, three species of squirrels, one species of spiny mouse, at least fifteen species of long-tailed rats and mice (family Muridae), one species of porcupine, one species of agouti, one paca, two canids, five mustelids, four species of procyonids, six species of felines, two species of wild pigs, two species of deer, and one tapir.

UGA Costa Rica

The University of Georgia uses a 155-acre satellite campus outside of the Monteverde region in the lower San Luis community. UGA Costa Rica operates numerous study abroad programs, ecological and forestry research, as well as ecotourism via on-campus lodging, the Ecolodge San Luis. Additionally, UGA Costa Rica is responsible for various conservation and sustainability initiatives in the San Luis Valley, namely its Carbon Offset Program and reforestation efforts in the Pájaro Campana Biological Corridor. In May 2019, ownership of the campus was transferred to CIEE (Council on International Educational Exchange), which only hosts University of Georgia and other academic groups, not tourists.

References

External links

 Monteverde Travel Magazine - Monteverde Travel Magazine

Cantons of Puntarenas Province
Districts of Puntarenas Province
Populated places in Puntarenas Province
Tourist attractions in Puntarenas Province
Tourism in Costa Rica